The Benetton B187 is a Formula One racing car designed by Rory Byrne and raced by the Benetton team in the 1987 Formula One World Championship. The B187 replaced the B186 used in the  season.

Engine 

For , the B187 was replaced by the B188, which was powered by the naturally aspirated Ford DFR V8 engine.

Competition and engine development history 
Driven by Belgian Thierry Boutsen and Italian Teo Fabi, the team and the B187 got off to a good start with Boutsen finishing 5th at the season opening Brazilian Grand Prix, but after that the high boost the team ran in order to keep up with their competition saw the reliability of the TEC engine become suspect. However, by running less turbo boost (which hampered speed but also saw the reliability woes go down), by mid-season both Fabi and Boutsen were regularly challenging the top 4 teams of McLaren, Williams, Lotus and Ferrari for podium finishes. Boutsen led the Mexican Grand Prix (the race the team had won in 1986) before being forced to retire.

Boutsen finished eighth in the Drivers' Championship with 16 points while Fabi, in his last year in F1, finished ninth with 12 points. With a total of 28 points, Benetton finished fifth in the Constructors' Championship.

Aftermath 
In 1989, Jackie Stewart drove the B187 as part of a show where he drove a number of race cars, including several Formula One machines. He declared it to be one of the better cars he drove.

Complete Formula One results
(key) (Results in italics indicate fastest lap)

References

External links

B187
1987 Formula One season cars